The climate of south-west England is classed as oceanic (Cfb) according to the Köppen climate classification. The oceanic climate is typified by frequent cloudy skies, cool winters with cool summers and precipitation all year round, with more experienced in winter. It is the second windiest area of the United Kingdom, the majority of winds coming from the south-west and north-east. Government organisations predict the area will experience a rise in temperature and become the hottest region in the United Kingdom.

Inland areas of low altitude experience the least amount of precipitation. They have the highest summer maxima temperatures, but winter minima are lower than those of the coast. Snowfalls are more frequent in comparison to the coast, but less so in comparison to higher ground. They experience the lowest wind speeds and the total sunshine hours are between those of the coast and the moors. This typical climate of inland areas is more noticeable the further north-east into the region.

In comparison to inland areas, the coast experiences high minimum temperatures, especially in winter, and slightly lower maximum temperatures during the summer. Rainfall is lowest at the coast and snowfall there is rarer than the rest of the region. Coastal areas are the windiest parts of the peninsula and they receive the most sunshine. The general coastal climate becomes more prevalent further south-west into the region.

The south-west has areas of moorland inland such as Bodmin Moor, Dartmoor and Exmoor. Because of their high altitude they experience lower temperatures and more precipitation than the rest of the south west (approximately twice as much rainfall as lowland areas). Both of these factors also result in the highest levels of snowfall and the lowest levels of sunshine. Exposed areas of the moors are windier than the lowlands and can be almost as windy as the coast.

Definition 
Information in this article relates to the Met Office definition of south-west England, which covers Cornwall, Devon, Somerset, North Somerset, Bath and North East Somerset, South Gloucestershire, the City of Bristol and the Isles of Scilly.  This is a smaller area than the UK Government's South West England region, which also covers Gloucestershire, Wiltshire and Dorset.  The region is also sometimes loosely described as the West Country.

Temperature 
The south-west experiences a seasonal temperature variation, although it is less extreme than most of the United Kingdom. This is because the sea is in closer proximity to inland areas of the south-west than inland areas of most of the United Kingdom and the sea has less seasonal temperature variance.

The sea surrounding the south-west peninsula has the highest annual mean temperature of any sea in the United Kingdom, with a temperature close to  — . Coastal areas of Cornwall and the Isles of Scilly experience annual mean temperatures similar to that of the sea as the prevailing wind is from the sea. Towards the north-east of the region, the annual mean temperature decreases and is closer to just over 10 °C/51 °F. The sea's influence on annual temperature range is highest in west Cornwall, where the range is approximately 9 °C/14 °F. In the north-east of the region, the range is approximately 12 °C/22 °F. Inland areas are affected by their altitude: the mean temperature decreases as altitude increases.

The sea's influence in the south-west usually prevents cold temperatures, however temperatures can plummet during periods of cold easterly air flow: all of which have been recorded in January. Further to the north-east of the region, temperatures reached  in Yeovilton, Somerset in 1982.

Extremely high temperatures (heat waves) are rare in the south-west. Their occurrence is caused by a dry south-easterly air flow off Mainland Europe or the short-lived 'Spanish plume', (caused when low pressure sat to the south west of the UK and High pressure over the Low countries /southern North Sea creates a southerly airflow that sucks up hot air originating from Iberia, and as it crosses Bay of Biscay it picks up moisture and raises humidity levels to uncomfortable levels).

Overnight lows can be uncomfortable, not dropping below 19-20 °C(66-68 °F).

Sunshine 

Average annual sunshine totals rise above 1,600 hours along the coast—higher totals are recorded on the region's southern coast at the English Channel than on its northern coast along the Bristol Channel. 1,400–1,600 hours of annual sunshine are to be expected in inland areas of the south west. In June 1925, the highest monthly sunshine totals were recorded: 381.7 hours at Pendennis Point, Cornwall and 334.8 hours at Long Ashton, Somerset. During the winter months, which are the dullest, less than 20 hours of monthly sunshine have occasionally been recorded. In December 1998 there were 20 days without sun recorded at Yeovilton.

In general, June is the sunniest month, because the days are at their longest, and December is the dullest. The Azores High affects the south-west of England as it extends north-eastwards towards the British Isles. The Azores is more influential in summer. The high pressure reduces cloud cover through the process of subsidence. In spring and summer, the sea is cool compared to the air temperature, causing less convective cloud cover. The convective cloud forms more frequently inland, especially on higher ground such as Dartmoor, Exmoor and Bodmin Moor, thus reducing the amount of sunshine. Coastal areas of the south-west have more hours of sunshine.

Rainfall 
Most of the rainfall in the south-west is caused by Atlantic depressions or by convection. Most of the rainfall in autumn and winter is caused by the Atlantic depressions, which is when they are most active. In summer, a large proportion of the rainfall is caused by sun heating the ground leading to convection and to showers and thunderstorms.

The Isles of Scilly have annual rainfall totals of about 850–900 mm (33–35 in). Coastal areas of Cornwall and Devon typically receive 900–1,000 mm (35–39 in) of rainfall annually. The altitude increases the amount of rainfall. Highland areas are cooler, causing moist air to cool below the dew point as it rises over high ground forming clouds and then rain.

The sea reaches its highest temperature in late summer/autumn and its lowest in late winter/spring. As a result, the highest rainfall can be expected in autumn and lowest in spring. The months with the most rainfall are in autumn and winter. Monthly rainfall can be variable. The wettest station of the region, Princetown, has recorded  of rain during May.

The number of days with at least  of rainfall correlates to the pattern of quantity of rainfall. In late spring/summer, 9–10 days per month recorded rain in coastal areas, 7–9 days in the north-east and 12–13 days at high altitude (Princetown). In winter these values increase to 15–16 on the coast, 12–13 in the north-east and over 18 days in high altitude.

Very heavy rainfall, spanning 5–15 hours, is rare in the south-west. Also, on 8 June 1957,  fell at Camelford, Cornwall and in June 1917,  fell in 13 hours in Bruton, Somerset. Approximately 100 people had to be rescued by helicopter and 116 cars were swept out to sea.

From December 2013 onwards the Somerset Levels suffered severe flooding as part of the wider winter storms of 2013–14 in the United Kingdom. People have attempted to drain the area for hundreds of years. The village of Thorney was abandoned and Muchelney cut off.

Snowfall 

Snowfall normally occurs between November and April and short snowfalls can occur between October and May on higher ground. The snow usually only settles between the months of December and March.

In the south-west the number of days of snowfall increases with altitude: per approximately every  increase in altitude, the number of days of snow falling increases by five days. From 1979 to 2000, on average there were fewer than 10 days per winter in which snow fell in the islands of the south-west and the coastal areas of Devon and Cornwall, and slightly more than 10 days on average near to the Severn Estuary. Inland areas received between 8–15 days of snow falling; more days of snow fall were noted particularly to the north-east. Some upland areas received, on average, over 25 days per year of snow falling.

Similarly to the ratio of days of snow falling to altitude, the number of days in which snow settles on the ground increases by five days per every  increase in altitude. In the south-west, it is rare that snow settles on the ground. From 1979 to 2000 on average, lowland areas did not record any lying snow in one out of every three years. During this period, snow settled, on average, fewer than three days per year across the Isles of Scilly and on the coasts of Devon and Cornwall. Inland areas had an average of 5–10 days of snow lying per year and, as with the days of snow falling; this was higher towards the north-east of the region. More than 20 days of snow lying can be expected on the high grounds of Dartmoor and Exmoor.

The south-west, although the mildest region of the British Isles, has been affected by some of the most severe blizzards. Blizzards are a rare occurrence in the United Kingdom, but can occur when especially cold easterly winds from the continent meet an Atlantic depression, causing a prolonged snowstorm and high winds.

Wind 
The south-west is the second most exposed area of the United Kingdom; second to western Scotland. The strong winds are caused by deep depressions across or close to the British Isles. Winds are stronger in the winter-half year, as the depressions' strength and frequency increase. The lightest mean wind speeds are in summer. The speed of peak gusts and mean wind speed follow a similar pattern throughout the year.

Mean wind speeds are generally lower to the north-east of the region and in inland areas. Yeovilton, lowland Somerset, has a mean wind speed that is two thirds that of St. Mawgan in coastal Cornwall. An increase in altitude in inland areas generally increases the mean wind speed; similar wind speeds are recorded on the highest parts of Exmoor and Dartmoor as on the coast.

The majority, and the strongest, of the winds are from the south-west and north-east as Atlantic depressions pass from west to east over the United Kingdom. When an Atlantic depression reaches the United Kingdom, winds usually blow from the south or south-west, and they change to west or north-west when the depression leaves. If a depression passes along the English Channel, strong winds can occur from the east or north-east. Due to anticyclogenesis over Scandinavia, the majority of winds in Spring are from the north-east. Coastal areas of the south-west usually experience calm or very light winds that do not have a classifiable wind direction less than 6% of the time; this figure is 15% in the north-east and inland areas.

Islands and exposed headlands have the highest number of days per year of gale-force winds (averaged out over ten consecutive minutes). A gale-force wind is defined as being at least , which is 8 on the modern Beaufort scale. Gales are recorded approximately 24 days per year in the Isles of Scilly and coastal Cornwall. Further north-east and further inland, the number of days decreases. Plymouth, coastal Devon, receives 16 days; Yeovilton, Somerset, receives seven; and Long Ashton, north-west Somerset, receives four. Wind speeds can vary on local topography: wooded or urban areas sheltered by hills receive fewer days of gales and lower wind speeds.

Widespread winds from the Burns' Day storm on 25 January 1990 overturned vehicles and damaged buildings. The Bristol Channel floods on 30 January 1607 apparently caused "many thousand" deaths and may have destroyed several small harbours. The cause of it is disputed to be either a European windstorm or a tsunami.

Future 

According to a study by the Met Office, within 40 years the average temperature is likely to increase by 2 °C (4 °F) in the south-west and the average warmest summer day will increase by 3 °C (6 °F) to be . It predicts that the region will have one of the highest annual temperatures in the United Kingdom and there will be an estimated  increase in winter precipitation.

The rise in temperature could lead to outdoor citrus cultivation being possible. Following the announcement, the government of the United Kingdom called on the local authorities and other organisation to prepare for the consequences. All major government investments will have to consider the risks as a result of future climate change.

A report from the Environment Agency said that, over the next 25 years, investment would need to double for the building and upkeep of flood defences in order to maintain the current levels of flood protection and counter the effects of climate change. Flooding from rivers and the sea currently puts 65,369 properties at risk in Devon and Cornwall, 29,577 of which are at "significant risk". Current flood defence schemes protect some of these properties from flooding. Richard Cresswell, the regional director for the Environment Agency in the south west, said: 
"The latest UK climate change data shows that the risk of flooding and coastal erosion will continue to increase in future due to rising sea levels and more frequent and heavy storms."
£357 million on flood risk management in Cornwall, Devon, Dorset, Somerset, South Gloucestershire and Wiltshire has been spent since 2002, which includes spending continuing into 2009/10.

Rising sea levels are likely to cause more flooding on the Somerset Levels. Since 1990 the drainage board has been charged with looking at the rhynes, cleaning them out and keeping them clear, with the Environment Agency overseeing the work. With rising sea levels the work required to maintain the current sea defences is likely to become more expensive and it has been proposed by Ian Liddell-Grainger (Bridgwater-MP), that two inland seas are created.

Climate charts

See also 

 Climate of the United Kingdom

References

External links 
 Met Office weather forecast
 UK regional mapped averages

South-west
South West England